Milton High School may refer to:

United States
Milton High School (Florida) 
Milton High School (Georgia)
Milton High School (Massachusetts) 
Milton Area High School (Pennsylvania)
Milton High School (Vermont) 
Milton High School (Wisconsin)

Zimbabwe
Milton High School (Zimbabwe)